General Sir George Hewett, 1st Baronet  (11 June 1750 – 21 March 1840) was Commander-in-Chief, India and then Commander-in-Chief, Ireland for the British Army.

Military career
Educated at Wimborne Grammar School and the Royal Military Academy, Woolwich, Hewett was commissioned into the 70th Regiment of Foot in 1762. In 1771, he went to New York to help control the Carib Uprising and in 1780 he took part in the Siege of Charlestown.

In 1787, he was appointed Commanding Officer of the 43rd Regiment of Foot and in 1791, he went to Ireland where he became Adjutant-General and raised a new Regiment which was designated the 92nd Regiment of Foot.

He returned to England, where he served as Inspector General of Recruiting for the British Army from 1798 to 1804. He was given the colonelcy of the 61st (South Gloucestershire) Regiment of Foot for life in 1800 and became Barrackmaster-General in 1804. In 1807, he became Commander-in-Chief, India and in 1809 he briefly took over the Government of India while the Governor-General put down a mutiny. His last appointment was as Commander-in-Chief, Ireland in 1813.

He was created a Baronet, of Nether Seale in the County of Leicester, on 6 November 1813.

He lived at Freemantle Park near Southampton.

Family
In 1785, he married Julia Johnson and together they went on to have five sons and six daughters, including Col. Sir George Henry Hewett, 2nd Baronet.

References

1750 births
1840 deaths
British Army generals
Knights Grand Cross of the Order of the Bath
Commanders-in-Chief, Ireland
British Commanders-in-Chief of India
61st Regiment of Foot officers
East Surrey Regiment officers
43rd Regiment of Foot officers
British Army personnel of the American Revolutionary War
Graduates of the Royal Military Academy, Woolwich
Members of the Privy Council of Ireland
Baronets in the Baronetage of the United Kingdom
People educated at Queen Elizabeth's Grammar School, Wimborne Minster